Mucho, Mucho is a Latin-oriented jazz album by organist Shirley Scott recorded and released in 1960 on Prestige Records as PRLP 7182.

Track listing 
"The Lady Is a Tramp" (Hart, Rodgers) - 9:41
"Muy Azul" (Scott) - 7:27
"I Get a Kick Out of You" (Porter) - 3:57
"Walkin'" (Carpenter) - 3:44
"Tell Me" (Scott) - 4:48
"Mucho, Mucho" (Scott) - 14:15

Personnel 
 Shirley Scott - organ
 Gene Casey - piano
 Bill Ellington - bass
 Phil Diaz - bongos
 Manny Ramos - timbales
 Juan Amalbert - congas

References 

1960 albums
Albums produced by Esmond Edwards
Albums recorded at Van Gelder Studio
Prestige Records albums
Shirley Scott albums